In computer security, mandatory access control (MAC) refers to a type of access control by which the operating system or database constrains the ability of a subject or initiator to access or generally perform some sort of operation on an object or target.  In the case of operating systems, a subject is usually a process or thread; objects are constructs such as files, directories, TCP/UDP ports, shared memory segments, IO devices, etc.  Subjects and objects each have a set of security attributes.  Whenever a subject attempts to access an object, an authorization rule enforced by the operating system kernel examines these security attributes and decides whether the access can take place.  Any operation by any subject on any object is tested against the set of authorization rules (aka policy) to determine if the operation is allowed. A database management system, in its access control mechanism, can also apply mandatory access control; in this case, the objects are tables, views, procedures, etc.

With mandatory access control, this security policy is centrally controlled by a security policy administrator; users do not have the ability to override the policy and, for example, grant access to files that would otherwise be restricted.  By contrast, discretionary access control (DAC), which also governs the ability of subjects to access objects, allows users the ability to make policy decisions and/or assign security attributes.  (The traditional Unix system of users, groups, and read-write-execute permissions is an example of DAC.) MAC-enabled systems allow policy administrators to implement organization-wide security policies.  Under MAC (and unlike DAC), users cannot override or modify this policy, either accidentally or intentionally.  This allows security administrators to define a central policy that is guaranteed (in principle) to be enforced for all users.

Historically and traditionally, MAC has been closely associated with multilevel security (MLS) and specialized military systems. In this context, MAC implies a high degree of rigor to satisfy the constraints of MLS systems.  More recently, however, MAC has deviated out of the MLS niche and has started to become more mainstream. The more recent MAC implementations, such as SELinux and AppArmor for Linux and Mandatory Integrity Control for Windows, allow administrators to focus on issues such as network attacks and malware without the rigor or constraints of MLS.

Historical background and implications for multilevel security 
Historically, MAC was strongly associated with multilevel security (MLS) as a means of protecting US classified information. The Trusted Computer System Evaluation Criteria (TCSEC), the seminal work on the subject, provided the original definition of MAC as "a means of restricting access to objects based on the sensitivity (as represented by a label) of the information contained in the objects and the formal authorization (i.e., clearance) of subjects to access information of such sensitivity". Early implementations of MAC such as Honeywell's SCOMP, USAF SACDIN, NSA Blacker, and Boeing's MLS LAN focused on MLS to protect military-oriented security classification levels with robust enforcement.

The term mandatory in MAC has acquired a special meaning derived from its use with military systems.  In this context, MAC implies an extremely high degree of robustness that assures that the control mechanisms can resist any type of subversion, thereby enabling them to enforce access controls that are mandated by order of a government such as the Executive Order 12958 for US classified information.  Enforcement is supposed to be more imperative than for commercial applications.  This precludes enforcement by best-effort mechanisms; only mechanisms that can provide absolute or near-absolute enforcement of the mandate are acceptable for MAC.  This is a tall order and sometimes assumed unrealistic by those unfamiliar with high assurance strategies, and very difficult for those who are.

Strength

Degrees 
In some systems, users have the authority to decide whether to grant access to any other user.  To allow that, all users have clearances for all data.  This is not necessarily true of an MLS system.  If individuals or processes exist that may be denied access to any of the data in the system environment, then the system must be trusted to enforce MAC.  Since there can be various levels of data classification and user clearances, this implies a quantified scale for robustness.  For example, more robustness is indicated for system environments containing classified Top Secret information and uncleared users than for one with Secret information and users cleared to at least Confidential.  To promote consistency and eliminate subjectivity in degrees of robustness, an extensive scientific analysis and risk assessment of the topic produced a landmark benchmark standardization quantifying security robustness capabilities of systems and mapping them to the degrees of trust warranted for various security environments.  The result was documented in CSC-STD-004-85. Two relatively independent components of robustness were defined: Assurance Level and Functionality.  Both were specified with a degree of precision that warranted significant confidence in certifications based on these criteria.

Evaluation 

The Common Criteria is based on this science and it intended to preserve the Assurance Level as EAL levels and the functionality specifications as Protection Profiles.  Of these two essential components of objective robustness benchmarks, only EAL levels were faithfully preserved.  In one case, TCSEC level C2 (not a MAC capable category) was fairly faithfully preserved in the Common Criteria, as the Controlled Access Protection Profile (CAPP). Multilevel security (MLS) Protection Profiles (such as MLSOSPP similar to B2) is more general than B2.  They are pursuant to MLS, but lack the detailed implementation requirements of their Orange Book predecessors, focusing more on objectives.  This gives certifiers more subjective flexibility in deciding whether the evaluated product’s technical features adequately achieve the objective, potentially eroding consistency of evaluated products and making it easier to attain certification for less trustworthy products.  For these reasons, the importance of the technical details of the Protection Profile is critical to determining the suitability of a product.

Such an architecture prevents an authenticated user or process at a specific classification or trust-level from accessing information, processes, or devices in a different level. This provides a containment mechanism of users and processes, both known and unknown (an unknown program (for example) might comprise an untrusted application where the system should monitor and/or control accesses to devices and files).

Implementations

A few MAC implementations, such as Unisys' Blacker project, were certified robust enough to separate Top Secret from Unclassified late in the last millennium.  Their underlying technology became obsolete and they were not refreshed. Today there are no current implementations certified by TCSEC to that level of robust implementation. However, some less robust products exist.

 Amon Ott's RSBAC (Rule Set Based Access Control) provides a framework for Linux kernels that allows several different security policy / decision modules. One of the models implemented is Mandatory Access Control model. A general goal of RSBAC design was to try to reach (obsolete) Orange Book (TCSEC) B1 level. The model of mandatory access control used in RSBAC is mostly the same as in Unix System V/MLS, Version 1.2.1 (developed in 1989 by the National Computer Security Center of the USA with classification B1/TCSEC). RSBAC requires a set of patches to the stock kernel, which are maintained quite well by the project owner.
 TOMOYO Linux is a lightweight MAC implementation for Linux and Embedded Linux, developed by NTT Data Corporation. It has been merged in Linux Kernel mainline version 2.6.30 in June 2009. Differently from the label-based approach used by SELinux, TOMOYO Linux performs a pathname-based Mandatory Access Control, separating security domains according to process invocation history, which describes the system behavior. Policy are described in terms of pathnames. A security domain is simply defined by a process call chain, and represented by a string. There are 4 modes: disabled, learning, permissive, enforcing. Administrators can assign different modes for different domains. TOMOYO Linux introduced the "learning" mode, in which the accesses occurred in the kernel are automatically analyzed and stored to generate MAC policy: this mode could then be the first step of policy writing, making it easy to customize later.
 SUSE Linux and Ubuntu 7.10 have added a MAC implementation called AppArmor.  AppArmor utilizes a Linux 2.6 kernel feature called LSM (Linux Security Modules interface).  LSM provides a kernel API that allows modules of kernel code to govern ACL (DAC ACL, access-control lists).  AppArmor is not capable of restricting all programs and is optionally in the Linux kernel as of version 2.6.36.
 Linux and many other Unix distributions have MAC for CPU (multi-ring), disk, and memory; while OS software may not manage privileges well, Linux became famous during the 1990s as being more secure and far more stable than non-Unix alternatives.  Linux distributors disable MAC to being at best DAC for some devices – although this is true for any consumer electronics available today.
 Android since its 5.0 release has used SELinux to enforce a MAC security model on top of its original UID-based DAC approach.
 grsecurity is a patch for the Linux kernel providing a MAC implementation (precisely, it is an RBAC implementation). grsecurity is not implemented via the LSM API.
 Microsoft Starting with Windows Vista and Server 2008 Windows incorporates Mandatory Integrity Control, which adds Integrity Levels (IL) to processes running in a login session.  MIC restricts the access permissions of applications that are running under the same user account and which may be less trustworthy. Five integrity levels are defined: Low, Medium, High, System, and Trusted Installer. Processes started by a regular user gain a Medium IL; elevated processes have High IL. While processes inherit the integrity level of the process that spawned it, the integrity level can be customized on a per-process basis: e.g. IE7 and downloaded executables run with Low IL. Windows controls access to objects based on ILs, as well as for defining the boundary for window messages via User Interface Privilege Isolation.  Named objects, including files, registry keys or other processes and threads, have an entry in the ACL governing access to them that defines the minimum IL of the process that can use the object.  MIC enforces that a process can write to or delete an object only when its IL is equal to or higher than the object’s IL.  Furthermore, to prevent access to sensitive data in memory, processes can’t open processes with a higher IL for read access.
 FreeBSD supports Mandatory Access Control, implemented as part of the TrustedBSD project.  It was introduced in FreeBSD 5.0.  Since FreeBSD 7.2, MAC support is enabled by default.  The framework is extensible; various MAC modules implement policies such as Biba and multilevel security.
 Sun's Trusted Solaris uses a mandatory and system-enforced access control mechanism (MAC), where clearances and labels are used to enforce a security policy. However note that the capability to manage labels does not imply the kernel strength to operate in multilevel security mode.  Access to the labels and control mechanisms are not robustly protected from corruption in protected domain maintained by a kernel.  The applications a user runs are combined with the security label at which the user works in the session. Access to information, programs and devices are only weakly controlled.
 Apple's Mac OS X MAC framework is an implementation of the TrustedBSD MAC framework.  A limited high-level sandboxing interface is provided by the command-line function sandbox_init.  See the sandbox_init manual page for documentation.
 Oracle Label Security is an implementation of mandatory access control in the Oracle DBMS.
 SE-PostgreSQL is a work in progress as of 2008-01-27, providing integration into SE-Linux.  It aims for integration into version 8.4, together with row-level restrictions.
 Trusted RUBIX is a mandatory access control enforcing DBMS that fully integrates with SE-Linux to restrict access to all database objects.
 Astra Linux OS developed for Russian Army has its own mandatory access control.
 Smack (Simplified Mandatory Access Control Kernel) is a Linux kernel security module that protects data and process interaction from malicious manipulation using a set of custom mandatory access control rules, with simplicity as its main design goal. It has been officially merged since the Linux 2.6.25 release.
 ZeroMAC written by Peter Gabor Gyulay is a Linux LSM kernel patch.

See also 

 Bell–LaPadula model
 Access-control list
 Attribute-based access control (ABAC)
 Context-based access control (CBAC)
 Discretionary access control (DAC)
 Lattice-based access control (LBAC)
 Organisation-based access control (OrBAC)
 Role-based access control (RBAC)
 Rule-set-based access control (RSBAC)
 Capability-based security
 Location-based authentication
 Risk-based authentication
 Clark–Wilson model
 Classified information
 Graham–Denning model
 Mandatory Integrity Control
 Multiple single-level
 Security modes
 Smack (software)
 Systrace
 Take-grant protection model
 Type enforcement

Footnotes

References
 P. A. Loscocco, S. D. Smalley, P. A. Muckelbauer, R. C. Taylor, S. J. Turner, and J. F. Farrell. The Inevitability of Failure: The Flawed Assumption of Security in Modern Computing Environments. In Proceedings of the 21st National Information Systems Security Conference, pages 303–314, Oct. 1998.
 P. A. Loscocco, S. D. Smalley, Meeting Critical Security Objectives with Security-Enhanced Linux Proceedings of the 2001 Ottawa Linux Symposium.
 ISO/IEC DIS 10181-3, Information Technology, OSI Security Model, Security FrameWorks, Part 3: Access Control, 1993
 Robert N. M. Watson. "A decade of OS access-control extensibility". Commun. ACM 56, 2 (February 2013), 52–63.

External links
 Weblog post on the how virtualization can be used to implement Mandatory Access Control.
 Weblog post from a Microsoft employee detailing Mandatory Integrity Control and how it differs from MAC implementations.
 GWV Formal Security Policy Model A Separation Kernel Formal Security Policy, David Greve, Matthew Wilding, and W. Mark Vanfleet.

Computer security models
Computer access control
Operating system security
Access control